Awsworth is a civil parish in the Borough of Broxtowe, Nottinghamshire, England.  The parish contains four listed buildings that are recorded in the National Heritage List for England.  Of these, one is listed at Grade II*, the middle of the three grades, and the others are at Grade II, the lowest grade.  The parish contains the village of Awsworth and the surrounding area, and the listed buildings consist of a railway viaduct, a school and associated structures, and a war memorial.


Key

Buildings

References

Citations

Sources

 

Lists of listed buildings in Nottinghamshire